Just in Singapore (simplified Chinese: 一房半厅一水缸, literally "One Room, Half a Living Room, and a Water Basin") is a Singaporean Chinese modern comedic drama which was telecasted on Singapore's free-to-air channel, MediaCorp Channel 8. It made its debut on 25 February 2008 and ended on 4 April 2008. This drama serial consists of 30 episodes, and was screened on every weekday night at 9:00 pm. The series was repeated at 2 am on Sundays.

Cast

Main cast
Chen Liping as Nancy
Huang Wenyong as Lin Bang (Francis)
Fiona Xie as Lin Xiu Ming
Kang Cheng Xi as Su Ding Yi
Li Yinzhu as Zi Dong Sao ("Automatic Auntie")

Supporting Cast
 Jimmy Nah (MC King) as San Wan (Actor died during period of filming)
 Apple Hong as Qian Qian
 Paige Chua as Lin Xiu Zhen
 Hong Huifang as Wang Jiao
 Adam Chen as Ma Zhi Gang
 Patricia Mok as Ma Li (Mary)
 Nelson Chia as Luo Ba (Robert)
 Liang Tian as Kopi Shu
 He Bing as Kopi Sao
 Ong Ai Leng as Shu Min
 Rayson Tan as Jian Hui
 Zhang Xin Quan as Peter
 Yan Bingliang as Ah Pao
 Zhang Wei as Mr. Fang
 Hong Da Mu as Granny Ma
 Vivian Lai as Jin Yan

Synopsis
The story is set in a HDB estate and revolves around its occupants. Every day, heartwarming scenes of tears and laughter take place in these humble settings. Characters include Lin Bang, an over-the-hill stage-singer, and his family; Robert and Mary, a married couple who are not disabled in any way but totally rely on relief funds from the government to get by; Ma Zhigang, a man without conscience who secretly caused his grandmother's death so he can claim insurance funds; 'Auntie Auto' and 'San Wan who are misers; 'Uncle Kopi' and 'Auntie Kopi' who are still living in their rental flat even though their children are doing very well...

Uncle Kopi (Liang Tian) and Auntie Kopi (He Bing) have a large ceramic tub at home. Left behind by Uncle Kopi's father, it has held water for the baths of many generations in their family. When their youngest daughter (Ong Ai Leng) wishes to entrust her parents with the care of her young son, she is worried that the tub may be a hazard and thus asks her parents to dispose of it. The old couple is unwilling to give it up and decide to put it at their neighbour Grandmother Ma's (Hong Da Mu) home for the time being.

Grandmother Ma's grandson Ma Zhigang (Adam Chen) is a lazy young man who refuses to hold a proper job. He owes a huge debt and so decides to sell the tub. However, he runs into loansharks while on the way to sell the tub and therefore leaves the tub behind while on the run. He is saved by Qianqian (Apple Hong), a Vietnamese bride brought to Singapore by San Wan (MC King). Zhigang, seeing how beautiful Qianqian is, cheats San Wan of a large sum of money and instigates Qianqian to elope with him.

The tub left behind by Zhigang is picked up by the Weijie, the eldest son of the lazy couple Robert (Nelson Chia) and Mary (Patricia Mok). Thereafter, it ends up with Auntie Auto (Li Yingzhu), and then Lin Bang's (Huang Wenyong) family.

Lin Bang's wife Nancy (Chen Liping) runs a shrine and they have two daughters. Their eldest daughter Xiuzhen (Paige Chua), a university student, is pretty, intelligent, and carries a torch for Su Dingyi (Kang Chengxi), a handsome and stylish young man from a wealthy family.  But Lin Bang is actually her stepfather and so her biological father does not recognise her as his daughter. To get closer to him, she hides the fact that she is from a poor family, so that she will not feel ashamed of her parents.

Their younger daughter Xiuming (Fiona Xie) is not as intelligent as her elder sister. After finishing her 'N' levels, she operates a stall at a night market. She has grown up among the lower social levels and feels that even though people of this class are not wealthy and have no social status to speak of, they can etch an honest living and give support to one another. Hence, she does not mind when people find out that she lives in a rented flat, has a father who is a taxi driver by day and getai singer by night and a mother who gets up to dodgy things at the temple. Xiuming's honest and open nature attracts Dingyi and he begins to woo her. However his attempts often end in comedic failure or is misinterpreted by Xiuming.

Uncle Kopi's son (Rayson Tan), a professor, discovers that a Chinese ceramics auction by Sotheby's includes a particular piece named 'Nine Dragon Tub'. This is a precious treasure from the palace dating back to the year of Qing Kang and is valued at US$5,000,000. He suddenly remembers that there is a tub just like that in their home and it might just turn out to be that very same tub! Thus, he secretly tries to gain possession of it for himself. Unfortunately, the tub has been passed around and its whereabouts is unknown. Very quickly, news of the 'Nine Dragon Tub' spreads far and wide. Everyone is desperately trying to locate the tub...

The 'treasure' has in fact ended up with Lin Bang who is currently using it as a spa tub. He soaks himself in warm water in the tub every day to ease aches and pains. When Nancy finds out the true value of this tub, she decides to keep it a secret and sell the tub away quietly. This way, she will be able to get the family out of their rented flat and they will become wealthy folks. Will this plan of hers succeed?

Trivia
 One of the cast member of this drama, Jimmy Nah, also known as MC King, died during the period of filming for this drama serial. Thus, he only filmed 80% of the screentime from the requirement of his role. The remaining 20% of his role was filmed by a replacement. However, his face was edited into the replacement actor. Since he died during the period of filming, this was the last show/drama serial he was in.
 Most of the audience felt that Li Yin Zhu gave the best performance as her role Automatic Auntie out of the many cast members.
 This was the last Chinese drama serial Fiona Xie filmed before she left the local TV station, MediaCorp in December 2009.

Awards & Nominations
The other dramas and best theme songs nominated are Yi Xun 亦迅 – Just in Singapore, 一房半厅一水缸 (《屋檐》), Daren Tan 陈轩昱 – Crime Busters x 2 叮当神探 (《幻听》), Chew Sin Huey 石欣卉 – Perfect Cut 一切完美 (《我知道我变漂亮了》), Mi Lu Bing 迷路兵 – The Golden Path 黄金路 (《路》)
& Cavin Soh 苏智诚 – Love Blossoms 心花朵朵开 (《心花朵朵开》)

Star Awards 2009

Viewership rating and reception
Since the debut of this series, it has generated largely positive reviews from critics. This drama serial is ranked the third Highest Viewership Drama for Year 2008, behind The Little Nyonya and Nanny Daddy.

References

External links
Official Website (English Edition)
Official Website (Chinese Edition)
Theme song

Singapore Chinese dramas
2008 Singaporean television series debuts
Channel 8 (Singapore) original programming